Mario Swaby (born 7 November 1982) is a Jamaican international footballer who plays for Portmore United, as a midfielder.

Career
Swaby has played club football for Portmore United.

He made his international debut for Jamaica in 2007.

References

1982 births
Living people
Jamaican footballers
Jamaica international footballers
Association football midfielders